Eretmophorus kleinenbergi is a species of morid cod found in the Mediterranean Sea and possibly into the Atlantic Ocean. It is the only known member of its genus. However, the validity of this species has been questioned; this species may be an immature stage of another species of morid cod, though it possibly is neotenic.

References
 

Moridae

Fish described in 1889